Poul Elming (born 21 July 1949, Ålborg) is a Danish opera singer. He began his career as a baritone; making his professional debut in 1979 as a member of the Jutland Opera in Århus. He then pursued studies at the Juilliard School in New York City where his voice was re-trained in the tenor repertoire. In 1989, he made his debut as a tenor at the Royal Danish Theatre as the title hero in Richard Wagner's Parsifal. He has since sung leading roles with major opera companies and festivals throughout the world, including the Bayreuth Festival, the Berlin State Opera, the Liceu, the Lyric Opera of Chicago, the Royal Opera, London, the San Francisco Opera, and the Vienna State Opera among others.

References

External links

Interview with Poul Elming, February 26, 1996

1949 births
Living people
Danish operatic tenors
Juilliard School alumni
Operatic baritones
People from Aalborg
20th-century Danish male opera singers
21st-century Danish male opera singers